Coral Amiga is an English actress born in London. She is best known for her portrayal of Vorena the Elder, in the television series Rome. After attending The American School in London, she went on to receive a bachelor's degree at New York University.

Filmography

References

Living people
English television actresses
Actresses from London
People educated at The American School in London
New York University alumni
Year of birth missing (living people)